Hiroshi Nakamura may refer to:

 Hiroshi Nakamura (artist) (born 1932), Japanese artist
 Hiroshi Nakamura (biochemist) (1890–1974), Japanese biochemist
 Hiroshi Nakamura (dissident) (born 1930), Japanese dissident and convicted murderer
 Hiroshi Nakamura (architect) (born 1974), Japanese architect
 Hiroshi Nakamura (fighter) (born 1981), Japanese mixed martial artist